Iron oxides are chemical compounds composed of iron and oxygen. Several iron oxides are recognized. All are black magnetic solids.  Often they are non-stoichiometric.  Oxyhydroxides are a related class of compounds, perhaps the best known of which is rust.

Iron oxides and oxyhydroxides are widespread in nature and play an important role in many geological and biological processes.  They are used as iron ores, pigments, catalysts, and in thermite, and occur in hemoglobin. Iron oxides are inexpensive and durable pigments in paints, coatings and colored concretes. Colors commonly available are in the "earthy" end of the yellow/orange/red/brown/black range. When used as a food coloring, it has E number E172.

Stoichiometries 

Iron oxides feature as ferrous (Fe(II)) or ferric (Fe(III)) or both. They adopt octahedral or tetrahedral coordination geometry.  Only a few oxides are significant at the earth's surface, particularly wüstite, magnetite, and hematite.  

 Oxides of FeII
 FeO:  iron(II) oxide, wüstite 
 Mixed oxides of FeII and FeIII
 Fe3O4: Iron(II,III) oxide, magnetite 
 Fe4O5
 Fe5O6
 Fe5O7
 Fe25O32
Fe13O19
 Oxide of FeIII
 Fe2O3: iron(III) oxide 
 α-Fe2O3: alpha phase, hematite 
 β-Fe2O3: beta phase
 γ-Fe2O3: gamma phase, maghemite 
 ε-Fe2O3: epsilon phase

Thermal expansion

Oxide-hydroxides

 goethite (α-FeOOH), 
 akaganéite (β-FeOOH), 
 lepidocrocite (γ-FeOOH), 
 feroxyhyte (δ-FeOOH), 
 ferrihydrite (Fe5HO8 · 4 H2O approx., or 5 Fe2O3 · 9 H2O, better recast as FeOOH · 0.4 H2O)
 high-pressure pyrite-structured FeOOH. Once dehydration is triggered, this phase may form FeO2Hx (0 < x < 1).
 green rust (FeFeOH3x + y − z (A−)z where A− is Cl− or 0.5 )

Reactions
In blast furnaces and related factories, iron oxides are converted to the metal.  Typical reducing agents are various forms of carbon.  A representative reaction starts with ferric oxide:

In nature 
Iron is stored in many organisms in the form of ferritin, which is a ferrous oxide encased in a solubilizing protein sheath.

Species of bacteria, including Shewanella oneidensis, Geobacter sulfurreducens and Geobacter metallireducens, use iron oxides as terminal electron acceptors.

Uses
Almost all iron ores are oxides, so in that sense these materials are important precursors to iron metal and its many alloys.

Iron oxides are important pigments, coming in a variety of colors (black, red, yellow).  Among their many advantages, they are inexpensive, strongly colored, and nontoxic.

Magnetite is a component of magnetic recording tapes.

See also 
Great Oxidation Event
Iron cycle
Iron oxide nanoparticle
Limonite
List of inorganic pigments

References

External links

 Information from Nano-Oxides, Inc. on Fe2O3.
 The Iron One-Pot Reaction
 Iron Oxide Pigments Statistics and Information
 CDC – NIOSH Pocket Guide to Chemical Hazards

Iron compounds
Iron oxide pigments
Transition metal oxides